The Barai are a Hindu caste found in Uttar Pradesh, India.  The people of this community mainly uses "Chaurasia" as surname (or 'Title').

References

Social groups of Uttar Pradesh
Indian castes